Sir John Covert, 1st Baronet (6 June 1620 – 11 March 1679), was an English politician.

Covert was the son of Sir Walter Covert, of Maidstone, Kent, by Ann Covert, daughter and heiress of John Covert, of Slaugham, Sussex. He was created a baronet, of Slaugham in the County of Sussex, on 2 July 1660. The following year he was returned to parliament as one of two representatives for Horsham, a seat he held until his death in 1679.

Covert married Isabella Leigh, daughter of Sir William Leigh, of Longborow, Gloucestershire. They had one son, Walter Covert (d. 1672), and four daughters. The third daughter, Mary, was the second wife of Henry Goring. Covert died in March 1679, aged 58, when the baronetcy became extinct. Lady Covert died in September 1680.

References

1620 births
1679 deaths
Baronets in the Baronetage of England
English MPs 1661–1679
People from Slaugham